Propebela subtrophonoidea is a species of sea snail, a marine gastropod mollusk in the family Mangeliidae.

Description

Distribution
This species occurs in the Sea of Japan.

References

Further reading
 
 

subtrophonoidea